Tim Kirk is a writer, director, and producer who currently lives in Los Angeles.

He frequently collaborates with director Rodney Ascher, with whom he created the documentary Room 237, which premiered at the 2012 Sundance Film Festival and screened in the Directors' Fortnight section at the 2012 Cannes Film Festival. Kirk also produced Ascher's The Nightmare, The El Duce Tapes, the Shudder original series Primal Screen, and A Glitch in the Matrix.

He wrote and directed the Kickstarter-funded Director's Commentary: Terror of Frankenstein, and Sex Madness Revealed.

His writing includes the 2015 novel Burnt, and the 2019 short fiction anthology The Feral Boy Who Lives in Griffith Park.

Selected filmography

Awards and nominations

References

External links 

1962 births
Living people
American screenwriters
American male writers
American film producers
American film directors